Akbarabad or Akberabad or Akbarabad-e may refer to:

India
 Agra, called Akbarabad when it was the capital of the Mughal Empire

Iran

Ardabil Province
Akbarabad, Ardabil, a village in Germi County

Bushehr Province
Akbarabad, Bushehr, a village in Jam County

Chaharmahal and Bakhtiari Province
Akbarabad, Chaharmahal and Bakhtiari, a village in Lordegan County

East Azerbaijan Province
Akbarabad, East Azerbaijan, a village in Meyaneh County

Fars Province
Akbarabad, Darab, a village in Darab County
Akbarabad-e Hashivar, a village in Darab County
Akbarabad, Fasa, a village in Fasa County
Akbarabad-e Sardasht, a village in Fasa County
Akbarabad, Kavar, a village in Kavar County
Akbarabad, Khonj, a village in Khonj County
Akbarabad, Pasargad, a village in Pasargad County

Gilan Province
Akbarabad, Lahijan, a village in Lahijan County
Akbarabad, Rudsar, a village in Rudsar County

Golestan Province
Akbarabad, Aqqala, a village in Aqqala County
Akbarabad, Azadshahr, a village in Azadshahr County

Hamadan Province
Akbarabad, Bahar, a village in Bahar County
Akbarabad, Khezel, a village in Nahavand County
Akbarabad, Zarrin Dasht, a village in Nahavand County
Akbarabad, Tuyserkan, a village in Tuyserkan County

Isfahan Province
Akbarabad, Mobarakeh, a village in Mobarakeh County
Akbarabad, Nain, a village in Nain County

Kerman Province
Akbarabad, Esmaili, a village in Anbarabad County
Akbarabad-e Vaziri, a village in Anbarabad County
Akbarabad-e Kahdan, a village in Baft County
Akbarabad-e Mostowfi, a village in Fahraj County
Akbarabad, Jiroft, a village in Jiroft County
Akbarabad, Sarduiyeh, a village in Jiroft County
Akbarabad, Kerman, a village in Kerman County
Akbarabad-e Bahari, a village in Kerman County
Akbarabad-e Arjomand, a village in Narmashir County
Akbarabad-e Barkhordar, a village in Rafsanjan County
Akbarabad-e Hejri, a village in Rafsanjan County
Akbarabad, Rigan, a village in Rigan County
Akbarabad, Gonbaki, a village in Rigan County
Akbarabad, Shahr-e Babak, a village in Shahr-e Babak County
Akbarabad-e Rah Niz, a village in Sirjan County
Akbarabad, Najafabad, a village in Sirjan County
Akbarabad, Zeydabad, a village in Sirjan County
Akbarabad-e Now Kan, a village in Sirjan County
Akbarabad, Zarand, a village in Zarand County
Akbarabad-e Yek, a village in Zarand County

Kermanshah Province
Akbarabad, Kangavar, a village in Kangavar County
Akbarabad, Kermanshah, a village in Kermanshah County
Akbarabad-e Khaleseh Tappeh Ginu, a village in Kermanshah County
Akbarabad, Sarpol-e Zahab, a village in Sarpol-e Zahab County
Akbarabad, Sonqor, a village in Sonqor County

Khuzestan Province
Akbarabad, Khuzestan, a village in Izeh County
Akbarabad-e Laram, a village in Masjed Soleyman County

Kohgiluyeh and Boyer-Ahmad Province
Akbarabad, Kohgiluyeh and Boyer-Ahmad, a village in Boyer-Ahmad County

Kurdistan Province
Akbarabad, Kurdistan, a village in Divandarreh County

Lorestan Province
Akbarabad, Delfan, a village in Delfan County
Akbarabad, Dorud, a village in Dorud County
Akbarabad, Khorramabad, a village in Khorramabad County
Akbarabad, Kuhdasht, a village in Kuhdasht County
Akbarabad, Selseleh, a village in Selseleh County

Markazi Province
Akbarabad, Khomeyn, a village in Khomeyn County
Akbarabad, Saveh, a village in Saveh County
Akbarabad-e Nivesht, a village in Saveh County
Akbarabad-e Qushchi, a village in Saveh County
Akbarabad, Shazand, a village in Shazand County

Mazandaran Province
Akbarabad, Chalus, a village in Chalus County
Akbarabad-e Bala, a village in Chalus County
Akbarabad-e Chalus, a village in Chalus County
Akbarabad-e Pain, a village in Chalus County
Akbarabad, Tonekabon, a village in Tonekabon County

North Khorasan Province
Akbarabad, Esfarayen, a village in Esfarayan County

Qazvin  Province
Akbarabad, Qazvin, Iran
Akbarabad, Rudbar-e Alamut, Qazvin, Iran

Razavi Khorasan Province
Akbarabad, Kalat, a village in Kalat County
Akbarabad, Kuhsorkh, a village in Kashmar County
Akbarabad, Miyan Velayat, a village in Mashhad County
Akbarabad, Tus, a village in Mashhad County
Akbarabad-e Toroq, a village in Mashhad County
Akbarabad, Miyan Jolgeh, a village in Nishapur County
Akbarabad, Zeberkhan, a village in Nishapur County
Akbarabad-e Now Deh, a village in Rashtkhvar County
Akbarabad, Torbat-e Heydarieh, a village in Torbat-e Heydarieh County

Semnan Province

Sistan and Baluchestan Province
Akbarabad, Hirmand, a village in Hirmand County
Akbarabad, Irandegan, a village in Khash County

South Khorasan Province
Akbarabad, Birjand, a village in Birjand County
Akbarabad, Khusf, a village in Khusf County
Akbarabad, Tabas, a village in Tabas County

Tehran Province
Nasim Shahr, formerly named Akbarabad, a city in Tehran Province, Iran
Akbarabad-e Kazemi, a village in Pishva County, Tehran Province, Iran

West Azerbaijan Province
Akbarabad, West Azerbaijan, a village in Khoy County

Yazd Province

Pakistan 
 Akbarabad, Pakistan a town and Union Council of Kasur District

See also
 Akbarabadi
 Nazeer Akbarabadi (fl. 18th century), Indian poet
 Akbarabad-e Olya (disambiguation)